Stavropolsky (masculine), Stavropolskaya (feminine), or Stavropolskoye (neuter) may refer to:
Stavropol Krai (Stavropolsky kray), a federal subject of Russia
Stavropolsky District, a district of Samara Oblast, Russia
Stavropolsky, Russia, a rural locality (a settlement) in Stavropol Krai, Russia
Stavropolskaya, a rural locality (a stanitsa) in Krasnodar Krai, Russia

See also
Stavropol (disambiguation)